Loni Heuser (January 22, 1908 in Düsseldorf – March 6, 1999 in Berlin) was a German film actress.

Selected filmography

 Liebe in Uniform (1932)
 The Hour of Temptation (1936) - Barsängerin
 Abenteuer im Grandhotel (1943) - Hella Schnappich
 Dreizehn unter einem Hut (1950) - Minna Wiese
 Theodore the Goalkeeper (1950) - Frau Bröslmeier
 Good Fortune in Ohio (1950) - Fanny Schulz
 Immortal Light (1951) - Diseuse
 Unschuld in tausend Nöten (1951) - Lola Rolfs
 Die Frauen des Herrn S. (1951) - Xanthippe
 The Dubarry (1951) - Lola Violetta
 Decision Before Dawn (1951) - Fritzi Kollwitz (uncredited)
 A Very Big Child (1952) - Aline
 Mein Herz darfst du nicht fragen (1952) - Nurse
 Season in Salzburg (1952) - Hedi Prittwitz
 Fritz and Friederike (1952) - Berth, Feldwebel vom Frauenkorps
 Hannerl: Ich tanze mit Dir in den Himmel hinein (1952) - Frau Gerstinger
  (1953) - Berta Schröder
 Heute nacht passiert's (1953) - Wanda Meerwald
 Grandstand for General Staff (1953) - Seine Frau
 Hit Parade (1953) - Frau Gabler
 Life Begins at Seventeen (1953)
 The Abduction of the Sabine Women (1954) - Frau Friederike Gollwitz
 The Faithful Hussar (1954) - Ernestine Wacker
 Annie from Tharau (1954) - Alma Möske
 Ten on Every Finger (1954) - Loni
 The False Adam (1955) - Luise, Meyers Frau
 Music in the Blood (1955) - Cilly Mainsburg
 Sonnenschein und Wolkenbruch (1955)
 Mädchen mit schwachem Gedächtnis (1956) - Babett Howard
 Holiday am Wörthersee (1956) - Tante Susanne
 Hurra - die Firma hat ein Kind (1956) - Tante Mathilde
 Tired Theodore (1957) - Rosa Hagemann
 Der Bauerndoktor von Bayrischzell (1957) - Charlotte Wille - Chansonette aus Berlin
 The Big Chance (1957) - Henriette 'Henny' Hallersperg
 At the Green Cockatoo by Night (1957) - Tante Henriette
 The Elephant in a China Shop (1958) - Bessi, Wirtschafterin
 Bimbo the Great (1958) - Frau Wille, Zirkus-Agentin
 Love, Girls and Soldiers (1958) - Gisela von Siebenstern, seine Frau
 So ein Millionär hat's schwer (1958) - Madame Sorel
 Wenn die Conny mit dem Peter (1958) - Fräulein Säuberlich
 The Blue Moth (1959) - Elvira del Castros
  (1959) - Ludmilla Haberstroh, Marketenderin
 Als geheilt entlassen (1960) - Mutter Holubek
 Yes, Women are Dangerous (1960) - Elisabeth Myrtle
 Schlager-Raketen (1960) - Madame Laforte
 Das Dorf ohne Moral (1960) - Marianne Schulze-Hauser
 Three Men in a Boat (1961) - Carlotta, Grit's Mother
 Season in Salzburg (1961) - Hedi Pritwitz
 Beloved Impostor (1961) - Mrs. Ogden
 Ramona (1961) - Nannen
 Doctor Sibelius (1962) - Mrs. Golling
 So toll wie anno dazumal (1962) - Lola 'Lulila'
 The Phone Rings Every Night (1962) - Stiefmama Mary Meyer
 Breakfast in Bed (1963, TV Movie)
 If You Go Swimming in Tenerife (1964) - Christa's Mother
 The Girl from the Islands (1964) - Frau Liefke
 Freddy, Tiere, Sensationen (1964) - Frau Capello
 In Bed by Eight (1965) - Frau Dr. Diehlmann
 Donnerwetter! Donnerwetter! Bonifatius Kiesewetter (1969) - Madame Mathilda
 Ein dreifach Hoch dem Sanitätsgefreiten Neumann (1969) - Frau von Pfau
 Kommissar X – Drei goldene Schlangen (1969) - Maud Leighton
 Charley's Uncle (1969) - Frau Müggel
  (1969) - Aida Spüler
 Klein Erna auf dem Jungfernstieg (1969) - Frau Heimann
 Wir hau'n den Hauswirt in die Pfanne (1971) - Frau Möbius
 Willi Manages the Whole Thing (1972) - Cosima Schulze

References

External links
 

1908 births
1999 deaths
German film actresses
Actors from Düsseldorf
20th-century German actresses